The elections in India in 2016 include the five state legislative assembly elections. The tenure of the state legislative assembly of Tamil Nadu, West Bengal, Kerala, Puducherry, Assam, expired during the year. More than 18,000 Voter-verified paper audit trail (VVPATs) in 64 Assembly constituencies were used in these 5 elections. The dates of these elections were announced on 4 March 2016.

Lok Sabha by-elections

Legislative Assembly Elections

Assam

The tenure of the Legislative Assembly of Assam expired on June 5, 2016. The polls for the incumbent assembly were held in two phases on April 4 and 11 2016 to elect members of the 126 constituencies in Assam. BJP won 60 seats and became biggest party in the election.

West Bengal

The tenure of the Legislative Assembly of West Bengal expired on May 29, 2016. Like in 2011, the polls for the next assembly were held in six phases. The first phase, held in Naxal-affected areas, had two polling dates — April 4 and April 11. The other phases were held on April 17, 21, 25, 30 and May 5.

West Bengal election results were announced along with other four assemblies on 19 May 2016. All India Trinamool Congress under Mamata Banerjee won 211 seats, and thus was reelected with an enhanced majority.

Kerala

The tenure of the Legislative Assembly of Kerala expired on May 31, 2016. The polls for the next assembly were held on 16 May 2016. The Left Democratic Front won a clear victory with 91 in 140 seats.

Puducherry

The tenure of the Legislative Assembly of Puducherry expired on June 2, 2016. The polls for the next assembly were held on 16 May 2016 to elect members of the 30 constituencies in the non-contiguous territory. INC won 15 out of 30 seats.

Tamil Nadu

The tenure of the Legislative Assembly of Tamil Nadu expired on May 22, 2016. The polls for the next assembly were held on 16 May 2016 for the 234 seats of the Legislative Assembly in the state of Tamil Nadu in India. In the previous election in 2011, the AIADMK, under the leadership of Jayalalithaa, won a majority and formed the government.
The results declared on 19 May 2016 and AIADMK was able to retain power with a comfortable majority of 133 seats out of 231.

Legislative Assembly by-elections

Local Body Elections

Chandigarh

References

External links

Election Commission of India
West Bengal Election Opinion Poll
Kerala Election Opinion Poll
Tamil Nadu Election Opinion Poll
Assam Election Opinion Poll
Puducherry Election Opinion Poll
Election India Android Application

 
Elections in India by year